Chaerocina nyikiana is a moth of the  family Sphingidae. It is known from Malawi.

References

Chaerocina
Moths described in 2008